Legoland is a chain of family theme parks featuring the toy Lego.

Legoland may also refer to:

 Legoland (video game), a 1999 video game
 Legoland Billund, the original Legoland park
 Legoland, the former name of Lego City
 Southgate Estate, a modernist housing estate in Runcorn, demolished in 1990-92, was widely known as Legoland
 The MI6 Building, the headquarters of MI6 at Vauxhall Cross in London, nicknamed "Legoland" by secret agents

See also 

 List of Legoland parks
 Legoland Water Park (disambiguation)